Salvador Ponce Lopez (May 27, 1911 – October 18, 1993), born in Currimao, Ilocos Norte, was a Filipino writer, journalist, educator, diplomat and statesman.

He studied at the University of the Philippines (UP) and obtained a Bachelor of Arts degree in English in 1931 and a Master of Arts degree in Philosophy in 1933. At UP, he was drama critic for the Philippine Collegian and member of Upsilon Sigma Phi. From 1933 to 1936, Lopez taught literature and journalism at the University of Manila. He also became a daily columnist and magazine editor of the Philippine Herald until World War II.

In 1940, Lopez's essay "Literature and Society" won the Commonwealth Literary Awards. His essay posited that art must have substance and that poet José García Villa's adherence to "art for art's sake" is decadent. The essay provoked debates, the discussion centering on proletarian literature, i.e., engaged or committed literature versus the orientation of literature as an art for the sake of art itself.

He was appointed by President Diosdado Macapagal as Secretary of Foreign Affairs and then became ambassador to the United Nations for six years before being reassigned to France for seven years. He would also serve as Chairperson of the United Nations Commission on Human Rights.

Lopez was the president of the University of the Philippines from 1969 to 1975. He established a system of democratic consultation wherein decisions such as promotions and appointments were made through greater participation by faculty and administrative personnel; he also reorganized UP into the UP System.

It was during Lopez's presidency that UP students were politically radicalized, launching mass protests against the Marcos regime right from the so-called "First Quarter Storm" in 1970 to the "Diliman commune" in 1971. During the latter, Lopez called on all UP students, faculty, and employees to defend the university and its autonomy from Marcos's militarization, as the military sought to occupy the campus in search of alleged leftists, activists, and other opponents of the regime. Due to his defense of UP's autonomy and democracy, many considered him a progressive and a militant member of the UP academe.

References

 Media Museum Who's Who in Print Journalism - Salvador P. Lopez Retrieved September 29, 2005.
 Quindoza-Santiago, Dr. Lilia. Philippine Literature during the American Period Retrieved September 29, 2005.
 Godinez-Ortega, Christine F. The Literary Forms in Philippine Literature Retrieved September 29, 2005.

1911 births
1993 deaths
Filipino educators
Filipino writers
People from Ilocos Norte
University of the Philippines alumni
Secretaries of Foreign Affairs of the Philippines
University of the Philippines
Permanent Representatives of the Philippines to the United Nations
Ambassadors of the Philippines to France
Macapagal administration cabinet members
Presidents of universities and colleges in the Philippines